Climate change vulnerability (or climate vulnerability or climate risk vulnerability) is defined as the "propensity or predisposition to be adversely affected" by climate change. It can apply to humans but also to natural systems (ecosystems). Human and ecosystem vulnerability are interdependent. Climate change vulnerability encompasses "a variety of concepts and elements, including sensitivity or susceptibility to harm and lack of capacity to cope and adapt". Vulnerability is a component of climate risk. Vulnerability differs within communities and across societies, regions and countries, and can change over time. Approximately 3.3 to 3.6 billion people live in contexts that are highly vulnerable to climate change in 2021. 

Vulnerability of ecosystems and people to climate change is driven by certain unsustainable development patterns such as "unsustainable ocean and land use, inequity, marginalization, historical and ongoing patterns of inequity such as colonialism, and governance". Therefore, vulnerability is higher in locations with "poverty, governance challenges and limited access to basic services and resources, violent conflict and high levels of climate-sensitive livelihoods (e.g., smallholder farmers, pastoralists, fishing communities)".

Vulnerability can mainly be broken down into two major categories, economic vulnerability, based on socioeconomic factors, and geographic vulnerability. Neither are mutually exclusive.  

There are several organizations and tools used by the international community and scientists to assess climate vulnerability.

Definition 
Climate change vulnerability is defined as the "propensity or predisposition to be adversely affected" by climate change. It can apply to humans but also to natural systems (ecosystems). Human and ecosystem vulnerability are interdependent. Climate change vulnerability encompasses "a variety of concepts and elements, including sensitivity or susceptibility to harm and lack of capacity to cope and adapt". Vulnerability is a component of climate risk. 

The adaptive capacity refers to a community's capacity to create resiliency infrastructure, while the sensitivity and exposure elements are both tied to economic and geographic elements that vary widely in differing communities. There are, however, many commonalities between vulnerable communities.

Climate vulnerability can include a wide variety of different meanings, situations and contexts in climate change research, but has been a central concept in academic research since 2005. The concept was defined in the third IPCC report in 2007 as "the degree to which a system is susceptible to, and unable to cope with, adverse effects of climate change, including climate variability and extremes". The IPCC Sixth Assessment Report in 2022 stated that "approaches to analysing and assessing vulnerability have evolved since previous IPCC assessments". In this report, vulnerability is defined as "the propensity or predisposition to be adversely affected, and encompasses a variety of concepts and elements, including sensitivity or susceptibility to harm and lack of capacity to cope and adapt". An important development is that it is increasingly recognised that vulnerability of ecosystems and people to climate change differs substantially among and within regions.

Scale 
Vulnerability differs within communities and across societies, regions and countries, and can change over time. Approximately 3.3 to 3.6 billion people live in contexts that are highly vulnerable to climate change in 2021. Vulnerability assessment is important because it provides information that can be used to develop management actions in response to climate change

Types 
Vulnerability can mainly be broken down into two major categories, economic vulnerability, based on socioeconomic factors, and geographic vulnerability. Neither are mutually exclusive. However, the widespread impacts of climate change have led to the use of "climate vulnerability" to describe less systemic concerns, such as individual health vulnerability, vulnerable situations or other applications beyond impacted systems, such as describing the vulnerability of individual animal species.

Economic vulnerability 
At its basic level, a community that is economically vulnerable is one that is ill-prepared for the effects of climate change because it lacks the needed financial resources. Preparing a climate resilient society will require huge investments in infrastructure, city planning, engineering sustainable energy sources, and preparedness systems. From a global perspective, it is more likely that people living at or below poverty will be affected the most by climate change and are thus the most vulnerable, because they will have the least amount of resource dollars to invest in resiliency infrastructure.  They will also have the least amount of resource dollars for cleanup efforts after more frequently occurring natural climate change related disasters.

Vulnerability of ecosystems and people to climate change is driven by certain unsustainable development patterns such as "unsustainable ocean and land use, inequity, marginalization, historical and ongoing patterns of inequity such as colonialism, and governance". Therefore, vulnerability is higher in locations with "poverty, governance challenges and limited access to basic services and resources, violent conflict and high levels of climate-sensitive livelihoods (e.g., smallholder farmers, pastoralists, fishing communities)".

Geographic vulnerability 
A second definition of vulnerability relates to geographic vulnerability. The most geographically vulnerable locations to climate change are those that will be impacted by side effects of natural hazards, such as rising sea levels and by dramatic changes in ecosystem services, including access to food. Island nations are usually noted as more vulnerable but communities that rely heavily on a sustenance based lifestyle are also at greater risk.

Vulnerable communities tend to have one or more of these characteristics:

 food insecure
 water scarce
 delicate marine ecosystem
 fish dependent
 small island community

Around the world, climate change affects rural communities that heavily depend on their agriculture and natural resources for their livelihood. Increased frequency and severity of climate events disproportionately affects women, rural, dryland, and island communities. This leads to more drastic changes in their lifestyles and forces them to adapt to this change. It is becoming more important for local and government agencies to create strategies to react to change and adapt infrastructure to meet the needs of those impacted. Various organizations work to create adaptation, mitigation, and resilience plans that will help rural and at risk communities around the world that depend on the earth's resources to survive.

Related concepts

Climate change adaptation 
Vulnerability is often framed in dialogue with climate adaptation. In the IPCC Sixth Assessment Report in 2022, climate adaptation was defined as "the process of adjustment to actual or expected climate and its effects in order to moderate harm or take advantage of beneficial opportunities", in human systems. In natural systems on the other hand, adaptation is "the process of adjustment to actual climate and its effects"; human intervention may facilitate this.

Climate resilience

Climate justice
Equity is another essential component of vulnerability and is closely tied to issues of environmental justice and climate justice. As the most vulnerable communities are likely to be the most heavily impacted, a climate justice movement is coalescing in response. There are many aspects of climate justice that relate to vulnerability and resiliency. The frameworks are similar to other types of justice movements and include contractariansim which attempts to allocate the most benefits for the poor, utilitarianism which seeks to find the most benefits for the most people, egalitarianism which attempts to reduce inequality, and libertarianism which emphasizes a fair share of burden but also individual freedoms.

Differences by region 

Different communities or systems are better prepared for adaptation in part because of their existing vulnerabilities.

With high confidence, researchers concluded in 2001 that developing countries would tend to be more vulnerable to climate change than developed countries. Based on then-current development trends, it was predicted that few developing countries would have the capacity to efficiently adapt to climate change. 
 Africa: Africa's major economic sectors have been vulnerable to observed climate variability.  This vulnerability was judged to have contributed to Africa's weak adaptive capacity, resulting in Africa having high vulnerability to future climate change. It was thought likely that projected sea-level rise would increase the socio-economic vulnerability of African coastal cities. Africa is warming faster than the rest of the world on average. Large portions of the continent may become uninhabitable as a result and Africa's gross domestic product (GDP) may decline by 2% as a result of a 1°C rise in average world temperature, and by 12% as a result of a 4°C rise in temperature. Crop yields are anticipated to drastically decrease as a result of rising temperatures and it is anticipated that heavy rains would fall more frequently and intensely throughout Africa, increasing the risk of floods.
 Asia: Climate change is expected to result in the degradation of permafrost in boreal Asia, worsening the vulnerability of climate-dependent sectors, and affecting the region's economy. 
 Australia and New Zealand: In Australia and New Zealand, most human systems have considerable adaptive capacity. However, some Indigenous communities were judged to have low adaptive capacity. 
 Europe: The adaptation potential of socioeconomic systems in Europe is relatively high.  This was attributed to Europe's high GNP, stable growth, stable population, and well-developed political, institutional, and technological support systems.
 Latin America: The adaptive capacity of socioeconomic systems in Latin America is very low, particularly in regard to extreme weather events, and that the region's vulnerability was high. 
 Polar regions: A study in 2001 concluded that: 
 within the Antarctic and Arctic, at localities where water was close to melting point, socioeconomic systems are particularly vulnerable to climate change.
 the Arctic is extremely vulnerable to climate change. It is predicted that there will be major ecological, sociological, and economic impacts in the region.
 Small islands: Small islands are particularly vulnerable to climate change.  Partly this was attributed to their low adaptive capacity and the high costs of adaptation in proportion to their GDP.

Differences by systems and sectors 
 Coasts and low-lying areas: Societal vulnerability to climate change is largely dependent on development status.  Developing countries lack the necessary financial resources to relocate those living in low-lying coastal zones, making them more vulnerable to climate change than developed countries. On vulnerable coasts, the costs of adapting to climate change are lower than the potential damage costs.
 Industry, settlements and society:
 At the scale of a large nation or region, at least in most industrialized economies, the economic value of sectors with low vulnerability to climate change greatly exceeds that of sectors with high vulnerability.  Additionally, the capacity of a large, complex economy to absorb climate-related impacts, is often considerable. Consequently, estimates of the aggregate damages of climate change – ignoring possible abrupt climate change – are often rather small as a percentage of economic production. On the other hand, at smaller scales, e.g., for a small country, sectors and societies might be highly vulnerable to climate change. Potential climate change impacts might therefore amount to very severe damages.
 Vulnerability to climate change depends considerably on specific geographic, sectoral and social contexts. These vulnerabilities are not reliably estimated by large-scale aggregate modelling.

Vulnerability of disadvantaged groups

People with low incomes

Indigenous peoples

Women

Tools 
Climate vulnerability can be analyzed or evaluated using a number of processes or tools. Below are several of them. There are several organizations and tools used by the international community and scientists to assess climate vulnerability.

Assessments 

Vulnerability assessments are done for local communities to evaluate where and how communities or systems will be vulnerable to climate change.  These kinds of reports can vary widely in scope and scale-- for example the World Bank and Ministry of Economy of Fiji commissioned a report for the whole country in 2017-18 while the Rochester, New York commissioned a much more local report for the city in 2018. Or, for example, NOAA Fisheries commissioned Climate Vulnerability assessments for marine fishers in the United States.

Vulnerability assessments in Global south 
In the Global South, the vulnerability assessment is usually developed during the process of preparing local adaptation plans for climate change or sustainable action plans. The vulnerability is ascertained on an urban district or neighborhood scale. Vulnerability is also a determinant of risk and is consequently ascertained each time a risk assessment is required. In these cases, the vulnerability is expressed by an index, made up of indicators. The information that allows to measure the single indicators are already available in statistics and thematic maps, or are collected through interviews. The latter case is used on very limited territorial areas (a city, a municipality, the communities of a district). It is therefore an occasional assessment aimed at a specific event: a project, a plan.

For example, Deutsche Gesellschaft für Internationale Zusammenarbeit (GIZ)  and the Ministry of Environment, Forests and Climate Change (MoEF&CC) in India published a framework for doing vulnerability assessments of communities in India.

Indexes

Climate Vulnerability Monitor

Climate Vulnerability Index 
James Cook University is producing a vulnerability index for World Heritage Sites globally, including cultural, natural and mixed sites.
The first application to a Cultural World Heritage property took place in April 2019 at the Heart of Neolithic Orkney in Scotland.

Mapping 
A systematic review published in 2019 found 84 studies focused on the use of mapping to communicate and do analysis of climate vulnerability.

Vulnerability tracking 
Climate vulnerability tracking starts identifying the relevant information, preferably open access, produced by state or international bodies at the scale of interest. Then a further effort to make the vulnerability information freely accessible to all development actors is required. Vulnerability tracking has many applications. It constitutes an indicator for the monitoring and evaluation of programs and projects for resilience and adaptation to climate change. Vulnerability tracking is also a decision making tool in regional and national adaptation policies.

International relations 
Because climate vulnerability disproportionally effects countries without the economic or infrastructure of more developed countries, climate vulnerability has become an important tool in international negotiations about climate change adaptation, climate finance and other international policy making activities.

Climate Vulnerable Forum

References 

Climate change adaptation
Risk analysis
Vulnerability
Ecology